Troy Darnell Vincent (born June 8, 1970) is a former American football cornerback for the Miami Dolphins, Philadelphia Eagles, Buffalo Bills and Washington Redskins of the National Football League (NFL). He was drafted by the Dolphins as the 7th overall pick in the 1992 NFL Draft. He played college football for Wisconsin, and has been named as a first-time nominee to the 2017 College Football Hall of Fame. On September 28, 2011, Vincent was named as one of the Preliminary Nominees for the Pro Football Hall of Fame Class of 2012 in his first year of eligibility and each year since.

He was previously inducted into the Sports Hall of Fame for the Philadelphia Eagles, and was entered into the Hall of Fame for the State of Pennsylvania, the University of Wisconsin and Pennsbury High, his old high school.

Vincent is currently the Executive Vice President of Football Operations for the NFL.

Professional career

Miami Dolphins
Vincent was drafted by the Miami Dolphins out of the University of Wisconsin–Madison as the seventh pick in the first round of the 1992 NFL Draft. He immediately became the Dolphins' starting left cornerback, and helped the Dolphins reach the AFC Championship Game his rookie year. During his time in Miami, he intercepted 14 passes and was among the team leaders in tackles.

Philadelphia Eagles
Vincent signed with his hometown team the Philadelphia Eagles in 1996, where he spent eight more seasons. Vincent made five consecutive Pro Bowls from 1999 to 2003. In 2002, Vincent was the recipient of the Walter Payton Man of the Year Award. In 2007 Vincent was named to the Philadelphia Eagles 75th Anniversary Team. Vincent announced the Philadelphia Eagles 2nd Round Draft Pick at the 2011 NFL Draft.

Vincent shares the record for the longest interception in Eagles history against the Dallas Cowboys in 1996; after teammate James Willis intercepted Troy Aikman four yards into the endzone, he ran 14 yards before lateraling to Vincent, who returned the interception 90 yards for a 104-yard touchdown.

Buffalo Bills
Prior to the 2004 NFL season, Vincent signed a free agent contract with the Buffalo Bills with the departure of cornerback Antoine Winfield. During his time in Buffalo, Vincent transitioned from the cornerback position, which he had played all his career, to free safety. In his first season as full-time safety in 2005, he had 66 tackles and a team-high four interceptions.

Vincent and starting strong safety Matt Bowen suffered injuries during the team's 2006 season opener. In order to clear a roster spot, the Bills placed him on injured reserve on September 10 as he was expected to miss up to two months. Once he was cleared to play, the Bills granted Vincent his release on October 13.

Washington Redskins
On October 16, Vincent signed a three-year contract with the Washington Redskins.

On November 5, 2006, against the rival Dallas Cowboys, Vincent recorded six tackles and had a crucial block on a 35-yard field goal attempt by kicker Mike Vanderjagt as time expired. The block, along with a 15-yard facemask penalty, allowed the Redskins to return the ball into field goal range for kicker Nick Novak and win the game 22–19 with no time. The improbable win is known as the "Hand of God" game. On February 22, 2007, the Redskins released Vincent.

Career achievements
On November 22, 2017, Vincent was honored by the Big Ten Conference as the 2017 recipient of the Ford-Kinnick Leadership Award. The annual award recognizes Big Ten football student-athletes who have garnered significant success in leadership roles following their academic and athletic careers.

Vincent was honored by Ebony Magazine at their February 4, 2017 Celebration of Champions Super Bowl event, where he received the Ebony Pathfinder Award.

NFL statistics

Current Role

As part of his role as the NFL's head of Football Operations since 2014, Vincent is a member of the American Football Coaches Association; an organization that represents coaches across the United States and is often consulted by the NCAA and the media regarding rule changes and developments occurring in college football. In an October 24, 2017 feature article in The Root publication, Vincent discussed his role as "bridge-builder" in the ongoing debate about players taking a knee during the playing of the national anthem. In the January 2018 issue of Monarch Magazine, Vincent talks about the "Game of Giving" and his commitment to American football. Vincent's leadership and impact on the game of football and social issues was detailed in Jarrett Bell's column in USA Today.

Deflategate Involvement 

After the 2014 AFC Championship Game, ESPN's Chris Mortensen reported that 11 of the Patriots' 12 game footballs were underinflated by at least two pounds each.

Mortensen's report later turned out to be false, and according to Mike Florio of Profootballtalk.com, Mortensen got his false info from NFL executive vice president of football operations Troy Vincent. Florio noted that it's "unclear" whether Vincent "deliberately lied" to Mortensen, however, Vincent was the one who handed out the initial four-game suspension to Brady in May 2015, suggesting a conflict of interest behind NFL walls as it investigated Brady.

Sr. Vice President of NFL Player Engagement
Vincent was selected as the Vice President of Active Player Development in February 2010. The NFL Players Development organization was renamed the NFL Player Engagement Organization in 2011.

NFLPA
Vincent was president of the NFL Players Association from March 29, 2004, until March 18, 2008. He was replaced by Kevin Mawae. On February 26, 2009, the Players Association announced they were investigating whether during his tenure as president Vincent disclosed confidential personal and financial information about a number of player agents. It is alleged Vincent emailed this information to his longtime business partner Mark Magnum for the benefit of a financial services firm co-owned by the two men. However, the Associated Press uncovered no evidence to support the contention that Vincent, by forwarding an NFLPA e-mail to his business partner, used agents' personal information to build his financial services company.

NFL Business Management and Entrepreneurial Program
While playing for the Buffalo Bills, Vincent approached the Wharton School with an idea to create educational programs to help fellow players prepare for life after football.  This led to the formation of the NFL Business Management and Entrepreneurial Program. Jason Wingard of the New York Daily News spoke to Vincent's vision and the need for those entering the NFL to prepare for retirement from football.

Community involvement and philanthropic efforts
A national advocate for victims of domestic violence and sexual assault, Vincent shared his family's own story of experiencing domestic violence in a February 19, 2017 guest editorial in the Naples News prior to his February 20 keynote address at The Naples Shelter for Abused Women and Children's annual event. In multiple forums, Vincent has advocated for an end to domestic violence.

Vincent has served on numerous boards over his career and served on the board of directors for the University of Wisconsin Foundation, and the State of New Jersey After 3 Program. He became the first active NFL player to serve on the National Board of Directors for Pop Warner Little Scholars Football.

Vincent and his family founded Love Thy Neighbor, a Foundation dedicated to fostering positive change in young people's lives through character, athletics and academics, serving as a not-for-profit Community Development and Opportunity Corporation. He is recognized for his Philanthropic efforts to build community and increase the overall well-being of humanity.

Vincent returned to one of the communities he grew up in; the Pennsbury School District in Bucks County, Pennsylvania. His visit was in support of the Fuel Up To Play 60 program at Edgewood Elementary School. During this visit, Vincent spent time with the students, teachers, and parents.

Personal life
Vincent and his wife Tommi, a cousin to drag racer Antron Brown, have five children – three sons and two daughters. His son Taron Vincent is a defensive tackle at Ohio State and ranked among the top 15 players of his recruiting class by ESPN. Vincent is a Christian.

References

External links
 Official website
 I am Trenton Community Foundation

1970 births
Living people
American football safeties
American football cornerbacks
African-American players of American football
Buffalo Bills players
Miami Dolphins players
National Conference Pro Bowl players
Philadelphia Eagles players
Washington Redskins players
Wisconsin Badgers football players
Presidents of the National Football League Players Association
Players of American football from Trenton, New Jersey
Sportspeople from Mercer County, New Jersey
Trade unionists from New Jersey
Pennsbury High School alumni
21st-century African-American sportspeople
20th-century African-American sportspeople
National Football League executives
Ed Block Courage Award recipients